Kubinskaya is a rural locality (a village) in Beketovskoye Rural Settlement, Vozhegodsky District, Vologda Oblast, Russia. The population was 26 as of 2002.

Geography 
Kubinskaya is located 47 km northwest of Vozhega (the district's administrative centre) by road. Osiyevskaya is the nearest rural locality.

References 

Rural localities in Vozhegodsky District